() was a one-off music competition in the Eurovision format, organised and broadcast by the German broadcaster Norddeutscher Rundfunk (NDR). It served as an alternative for the Eurovision Song Contest 2020, which was planned to be held in Rotterdam, Netherlands, but was cancelled due to the COVID-19 pandemic.

The pre-qualifying round was broadcast on the television channel One, while the final was broadcast on Das Erste. Both shows were made available for online streaming.

Participants

Pre-qualifying round 
The pre-qualifying round  took place on 9 May 2020 at 20:15 CEST and featured the following competing entries, which would have taken part in the Eurovision Song Contest 2020:

Final 

The final took place on 16 May 2020 at 20:15 CEST and featured the following 10 entries that received most points in the pre-qualifying round: During the live show, 2018 representative Michael Schulte performed his 4th placed entry "You Let Me Walk Alone" and new single "Keep Me Up" whilst Ben Dolic, who was to represent the country in 2020, performed his entry "Violent Thing".

See also 
 Eurovision: Europe Shine a Light
 Der kleine Song Contest
 Eurovision: Come Together
 Free European Song Contest
 Sveriges 12:a
 Die Grand Prix Hitliste

Notes

References 

2020 song contests
2020 in German television
Television shows about the Eurovision Song Contest
Eurovision Song Contest 2020
2020 in Germany
2020 in music
Events in Hamburg
May 2020 events in Germany